A graphite bomb is intended to be a non-lethal weapon used to disable an electrical grid. The bomb works by spreading a dense cloud of extremely fine, chemically treated carbon filaments over air-insulated high voltage installations like transformers and power lines, causing short-circuits and subsequent disruption of the electricity supply in an area, a region or even an entire small country. The weapon is sometimes referred to as blackout bomb or as soft bomb because its direct effects are largely confined to the targeted electrical power facility, with minimal risk of immediate collateral damage. However, since water supply systems and sewage treatment systems depend on electricity, widespread outbreaks of cholera and other waterborne diseases, causing large numbers of civilian deaths, have in the past been the direct consequence of this bomb's use.

Bomb structure
A graphite bomb consists of a metal canister that is filled with spools of graphite filament and an explosive device. On the American version the canister is typically labeled "BLU-114/B". The BLU is a military acronym for "bomb live unit". Once the bomb is ejected from a plane or missile, the device's explosive is activated. The explosive detonates, breaking the graphite filament into very fine pieces which is ejected from the metal canister into a large gas-like plume.

Uses

The graphite bomb was first used against Iraq in the Gulf War (1990–1991), knocking out 85% of the electrical supply. Similarly, the BLU-114/B "Soft-Bomb" graphite bomb was used by NATO against Serbia in May 1999, disabling 70% of that country's power grid. After initial success in disabling Serbian electric power systems, the electric supply was restored in less than 24 hours. The BLU-114/B was again used a few days later to counter Serbian efforts to restore damage caused by the initial attack. In the later stage of Operation Allied Force, NATO's air forces used conventional bombs and rockets to target power highlines and transformer stations.

South Korea has announced plans to build graphite bombs for use against North Korea to paralyse its electric grid in the event of a new war breaking out on the Korean Peninsula, subject to funding from the country's finance ministry. The weapons have been developed by South Korea's Agency for Defense Development, Yonhap news agency reported, as one element of the kill chain pre-emptive strike program. Contractors were selected in 2020 and the weapons are intended to be delivered by 2024.

Countermeasures

The effects of a graphite bomb can be mitigated by providing insulation. However, most power lines are not insulated in practice due to the high costs involved.

See also
Electromagnetic pulse
Operation Outward

References

External links
 

Non-lethal weapons
Bombs